Uspallata Airport is a public use airport located  north of Uspallata, a small town in the Mendoza Province of Argentina.

There is rising terrain to the north, and mountainous terrain in all other quadrants.

See also

Transport in Argentina
List of airports in Argentina

References

External links 
OpenStreetMap - Uspallata Airport
OurAirports - Uspallata Airport

Airports in Argentina
Mendoza Province